Neoclytus chevrolatii is a species of beetle in the family Cerambycidae. It was described by Laporte and Gory in 1835.

Neoclytus chevrolatii is also spelled "Neoclytus chevrolati".

References

Neoclytus
Beetles described in 1835